= Trissemus =

Scientific classification
- Domain: Eukaryota
- Kingdom: Animalia
- Phylum: Arthropoda
- Class: Insecta
- Order: Coleoptera
- Suborder: Polyphaga
- Infraorder: Staphyliniformia
- Family: Staphylinidae
- Genus: Trissemus; Jeannel, 1949

Genus of beetles

Trissemus is a genus of beetles belonging to the family Staphylinidae.

The species of this genus are found in Europe and Japan.

Species:

- Trissemus abyssinicus (Raffray, 1877)
- Trissemus acutipalpus Jeannel, 1951
